Sekolah Menengah Kebangsaan Taman Universiti (SMKTUN) is a secondary school located at Jalan Pendidikan, Taman Universiti, Iskandar Puteri, Johor, Malaysia.

History
The school started operation on 1 December 1994 with 1001 students and 46 teachers. Due to infrastructure problems and lack of buildings, the students attended classes at two temporary schools, Sekolah Rendah Kebangsaan Taman Universiti 2 and Sekolah Rendah Kebangsaan Taman Sri Pulai, SK Taman Universiti  1, and SMK Taman Universiti 3 with 644 and 349 students respectively. The first principal was En. Ahmad bin Atil.

Although the school started in 1994, it was officially opened ten years later in June 2004 by the Minister of Education, Dato' Hishammudin Tun Hussein.

In 1998, the school was recognised as an "A" grade school with 2,837 students and 124 teachers. To reduce the number of students new schools were built, namely Sekolah Menengah Kebangsaan Taman Universiti 2, Sekolah Menengah Kebangsaan Mutiara Rini, and Sekolah Menengah Kebangsaan Desa Skudai. As a result, in 2017 the number of students had decreased to 2,650 pupils, which gave a better student-teacher ratio.

1999, Special Education Class ( PPKI SMK Taman Universiti) was open by Pn Zakiah with 6 students. At present, Pendidikan Khas Student are 40 students led by En Abdul Murad abd Hamid.

The present principal is En. Rosman bin Bachok; 1st Senior Assistant, En. Saiful Azizi; Student Affairs Senior Assistant, Pn. Syarifah Rahimatul Hanna Syed Ali; Afternoon Session Senior Assistant, Pn. Latifah A. Ghani; and Special Education ( Pendidikan Khas ) Senior Assistant, En Abdul Murad bin Abd Hamid.

PIBG SMK Taman Universiti -http://pibgsmktamanuniversiti.blogspot.my/

Principals
 En. Ahmad Atil (1994–1996)
 Pn. Hjh Syam Haron (1997–1998)
 Pn. Zainab A. Jalil (1998–2001)
 Pn. Hjh Ramlah Rahmat (2001–2009)
 Pn. Nilam Othman (2009–2011)
 En. Mahamud Othaman (2011–2014)
 Pn.Hjh Zaini Binti Embong (2014–2015)
 Pn. Hajah Halimah bt Ahmad (2016-2018)
 En. Rosman bin Bachok (2019–2020)
 En. Hj Mat Jelani bin Tasriff (2020–present)

Administrators
 Principal: En Hj Mat Jelani bin Tasriff
 Senior Assistant 1: En Suhaimi bin Hashim 
 S.A HEM: En Mahfuz bin Teh 
 S.A Cocuriculum : En Rosli bin Md Husain 
 S.A Special Education : Pn Norfazlilah binti Ghapar Shah
 S.A Evening  Coordinator : Mdm Lim Hui Kian

1994 establishments in Malaysia
Educational institutions established in 1994
Buildings and structures in Iskandar Puteri
Secondary schools in Malaysia
Schools in Johor